Mother and Son is a 2022 French drama film directed by Léonor Serraille, starring , Stéphane Bak, Kenzo Sambin, Ahmed Sylla, Sidy Fofana and Milan Doucansi.

Cast
  as Rose
 Stéphane Bak as young Jean
 Kenzo Sambin as young Ernest
 Ahmed Sylla as Ernest
 Sidy Fofana as little Jean
 Milan Doucansi as little Ernest
 Audrey Kouakou as Eugenie
 
  as Thierry
  as Julius Caesar
 Lætitia Dosch

Release
The film premiered at the 75th Cannes Film Festival on 27 May 2022. It was released theatrically in France on 1 February 2023 by Diaphana Distribution. International distribution is handled by MK2 Films.

Reception
Peter Bradshaw of The Guardian rated the film 4 stars out of 5. Diego Semerene of Slant Magazine rated the film 3 stars out of 4 and calling it a "lovely film about feminine strength that also refuses to glorify motherhood." Guy Lodge of Variety wrote, "An unsentimental but stoically anguished portrait of a tough single mother and two vulnerable sons settling (or not) in France from the Ivory Coast, it shows how the immigrant experience can equally tighten the knot between parent and child, or permanently unravel it." Ben Croll of TheWrap wrote that the film "plays on the most intimate of registers" Stephanie Bunbury of Deadline Hollywood wrote a positive review of the film.

Wendy Ide of Screen Daily wrote that "although Mother And Son loses some of its energy as it unfolds, it is still a sensitive and complex examination of the shifting tensions in a migrant family." Lovia Gyarkye of The Hollywood Reporter wrote that the film "contains moving strokes", but "struggles to make a lasting emotional dent." Sophie Monks Kaufman of Little White Lies wrote that the writing "cannot match the poignancy of Lengronne’s performance."

References

External links
 
 

French drama films
2022 drama films
2022 films
2020s French films
France 3 Cinéma films